Robert Janicki (born 7 June 1997) is a Polish professional footballer who plays as a midfielder for Polish club Wisła Puławy. Besides Poland, he has played in Germany.

References

External links

1997 births
Living people
Footballers from Poznań
Polish footballers
Poland youth international footballers
Association football midfielders
Lech Poznań II players
Lech Poznań players
TSG 1899 Hoffenheim II players
Olimpia Grudziądz players
Warta Poznań players
Sandecja Nowy Sącz players
Chojniczanka Chojnice players
Wisła Puławy players
Ekstraklasa players
I liga players
II liga players
III liga players
Polish expatriate footballers
Expatriate footballers in Germany
Polish expatriate sportspeople in Germany